Andrija "Andro" Knego (born 21 October 1956) is a Croatian former professional basketball player.

Professional career
During his club career, Knego was the FIBA Saporta Cup Finals Top Scorer, in 1982.

Yugoslavian national team
Knego played with the senior Yugoslavian national basketball team at the 1976 Summer Olympics, the 1980 Summer Olympics, and the 1984 Summer Olympics.

References

External links
FIBA Profile
FIBA Europe Profile
Italian League Profile 
Spanish League Profile 

1956 births
Living people
Basketball players at the 1976 Summer Olympics
Basketball players at the 1980 Summer Olympics
Basketball players at the 1984 Summer Olympics
Croatian men's basketball players
KK Cibona players
Lega Basket Serie A players
Liga ACB players
Medalists at the 1984 Summer Olympics
Medalists at the 1980 Summer Olympics
Medalists at the 1976 Summer Olympics
Olympic basketball players of Yugoslavia
Olympic bronze medalists for Yugoslavia
Olympic gold medalists for Yugoslavia
Olympic medalists in basketball
Olympic silver medalists for Yugoslavia
Basketball players from Dubrovnik
Yugoslav men's basketball players
1978 FIBA World Championship players
1982 FIBA World Championship players
FIBA World Championship-winning players
Mediterranean Games gold medalists for Yugoslavia
Mediterranean Games medalists in basketball
Competitors at the 1975 Mediterranean Games
Competitors at the 1979 Mediterranean Games
Centers (basketball)